Once Upon a Time in Shanghai is a 1998 Chinese film directed by Peng Xiaolian, set in the tumultuous late-1940s just before the communist takeover of Shanghai. The film stars Wang Yanan and Yuan Quan.

Awards and nominations

External links

Shanghai Film Studio films
Chinese drama films
Films directed by Peng Xiaolian